Campeonato Primera B is the second tier in the Chilean football league system, and is organized by the Asociación Nacional de Fútbol Profesional. It was established in 1952 as Segunda División, and later renamed in 1996 to the current name. Since 1954, automatic promotion to and relegation from Campeonato Nacional has been granted, although Palestino and Rangers were promoted to the top flight in the first season.

Current teams

These are the teams participating in the Chilean Primera B as of the 2023 season:

Segunda División/Primera B Champions

Titles by Team

References
Second Division - RSSSF

 
2
1952 establishments in Chile
Second level football leagues of South America